Anna Galvin (born 19 October 1969; also credited as Anna Glavan) is an Australian actress. Her roles include Lex Luthor's assistant, Gina, in Smallville, and Lavender Eyes in Tin Man. She also played Maid Marian in the first season of the TV series The New Adventures of Robin Hood in 1997.

Personal life
Galvin was born 19 October 1969 in Melbourne, Australia, and trained at the Oxford School of Drama in England after graduating from the University of Melbourne.

In 2003, Galvin married Raul Inglis. They subsequently had a daughter. She is a classically trained mezzo/soprano singer. She can fence, horseback ride, ski, body surf and roller blade. She is often associated with the Arts Club Theatre Company in Vancouver, starring in such productions as The Philanderer, and Calendar Girls.

Filmography

References

External links

Actresses from British Columbia
Australian film actresses
Australian television actresses
Australian voice actresses
Canadian film actresses
Canadian television actresses
Canadian voice actresses
Living people
1969 births